Joni Töykkälä (born February 25, 1984) is a retired Finnish professional ice hockey forward who is currently an assistant coach for the HIFK under 16 hockey team.

Töykkälä played his first Liiga game in 2003 with the Blues where he had been playing his junior hockey.

Töykkälä  also played for Tappara, TPS, and HIFK in Liiga during his career.

Regular season and playoffs

References

External links

Living people
1984 births
Finnish ice hockey forwards
Espoo Blues players
HC Keski-Uusimaa players
HC Salamat players
HC TPS players
HIFK (ice hockey) players
Tappara players